Roger William Gilliatt (30 July 1922 - 19 September 1991) was a British professor of neurology at the National Hospital, Queen Square, where he specialised in the peripheral nervous system. He was a recipient of the Broderic scholarship of the Middlesex Hospital. His father was Sir William Gilliatt, the Queen's gynaecologist.

Professor Gilliatt was best man at the wedding of Princess Margaret and Antony Armstrong-Jones which took place on Friday, 6 May 1960 at Westminster Abbey in London.

References 

1922 births
1991 deaths
20th-century British medical doctors